Haskeir, also known as Great Haskeir is a remote, exposed and uninhabited island in the Outer Hebrides of Scotland.

Geography, geology and botany
There is no anchorage or shelter and access via the steep rocky cliffs may be difficult, even in calm conditions. There are several natural rock arches and a high cliff on the northern end of the island called Castle Cliff. Various small skerries lie immediately to the north and south. There is very little vegetation save for a few sea-pinks, campion, plantain and orache that can survive the salt spray.

Much of the bedrock is Lewisian gneiss

History
Skilðar or Skilðir (meaning shields) may have been the Old Norse name for Haskeir. Skildar certainly appears on a map by Nicholas de Nicolay from 1583. There are various theories that somehow the transposition of this name to nearby St Kilda may have created the name for this latter archipelago, whose origins are otherwise obscure.

There is an active lighthouse on the island constructed in 1997 and operated by the Northern Lighthouse Board, as well as the remains of a bothy, possibly built by fishermen from the Monach Islands.

Gallery

See also

 List of islands in Scotland
 List of lighthouses in Scotland
 List of Northern Lighthouse Board lighthouses

References

External links
 Northern Lighthouse Board

Uninhabited islands of the Outer Hebrides
Natural arches of Scotland